NOAAS Davidson (S 331) was a survey ship in commission in the National Oceanic and Atmospheric Administration (NOAA) from 1970 to 1989. Prior to her NOAA service, she was in commission in the United States Coast and Geodetic Survey from 1967 to 1970 as USC&GS Davidson (CSS 31), the second Coast and Geodetic Survey ship of the name.

Construction and commissioning
Davidson was built for the U.S. Coast and Geodetic Survey as a "coastal survey ship" (CSS) and was launched by the Norfolk Shipbuilding and Drydock Company at Norfolk, Virginia, on 7 May 1966, sponsored by Mrs. George P. Miller. The Coast and Geodetic Survey commissioned her on 10 March 1967 as USC&GS Davidson (CSS 31), the second Coast and Geodetic Survey ship to bear the name. When the Coast and Geodetic Survey merged with other agencies to form NOAA on 3 October 1970, she became part of the NOAA fleet as NOAAS Davidson (S 331).

Operations
With her home port at the Pacific Marine Center, Seattle, Washington, Davidson, along with her only sister ship, McArthur, spent her career conducting hydrographic surveys along the United States West Coast; in Alaskan waters, including in Prince William Sound in 1974, Tracy Arm, Endicott Arm, and Skagway Harbor; in San Diego Bay in 1975; and in the Pacific Ocean. She had a Bathymetric Swath Survey System (a stabilized deep-mapping sonar) and a Hydroplot data-recording system.

Taken out of service in 1989, Davidson was stricken in 1997 without ever having been formally decommissioned. After her disposal by NOAA, Davidson was operated for many years by Ocean Services Inc. a company in Seattle and with her home port in Sitka, Alaska.  She was used as a survey and research vessel in the Gulf of Mexico, the Caribbean, South America, Alaska, and various locations in the Pacific.  In 2002 from Feb 28th through May 11 she was chartered by Nauticos to search for Amelia Earhart's Lockheed 10E Electra.  She was eventually sold to interests in Nigeria and operates there as a security vessel in the Nigerian offshore oilfields.

Notes

References
NOAA History, A Science Odyssey: Tools of the Trade: Ships: Coast and Geodetic Survey Ships: Davidson
Couhat, John Labayle, and A. D. Baker III, eds. Combat Fleets of the World 1984/1985: Their Ships, Aircraft, and Armament. Annapolis, Maryland: United States Naval Institute, 1984. .
Prézelin, Bernard, and A. D. Baker III, eds. The Naval Institute Guide to Combat Fleets of the World 1990/1991: Their Ships, Aircraft, and Armament. Annapolis, Maryland: United States Naval Institute Press, 1990. .
Jourdan, David W. The Deep Sea Quest for Amelia Earhart. Cape Porpoise, Maine: Ocellus Productions, 2010.  

Ships of the National Oceanic and Atmospheric Administration
Ships of the United States Coast and Geodetic Survey
McArthur-class hydrographic survey ships
Survey ships of the United States
Ships built in Norfolk, Virginia
1966 ships